East Cleveland is a city in Cuyahoga County, Ohio, United States, and is the first suburb encountered when travelling east from Cleveland. The population was 13,792 at the 2020 census. East Cleveland is bordered by the city of Cleveland to its north, west, and a small section of its southwestern edge, and by Cleveland Heights to the east and the majority of its southern limits.

History

Historically East Cleveland was partially founded by Scottish immigrants, whose names can still be found in the city such as Shaw, McIlrath, and Eddy. East Cleveland incorporated as a village in 1895 and became a city in 1911. This charter included provisions for women's suffrage, which at the time was unheard of east of the Mississippi River. Before the charter passed, the city of Cleveland unsuccessfully attempted to annex the emerging municipality in 1910 and again in 1916.

East Cleveland is home to General Electric's historic Nela Park, the world's first industrial park. Nela Park, which was added to the National Register of Historic Places in 1975, continues to operate today as the functional headquarters for GE Lighting and is the city's second largest employer.  Huron Hospital, a satellite hospital of the Cleveland Clinic, was the city's largest employer.  Huron Hospital was a notable health care facility, being the only Level-II trauma center between Cleveland's MetroHealth Medical Center, located on West 25th Street, and Hillcrest Hospital, located in Mayfield Heights.  Huron Hospital closed in early spring of 2011.

East Cleveland includes a portion of Euclid Avenue, which from the 1860s through the 1920s was known as "Millionaires' Row." The many estates along this stretch of road in East Cleveland included the  home of the late John D. Rockefeller, Standard Oil founder and "the world’s first billionaire."

By the Great Depression a great number of homes along "Millionaires' Row" were demolished or abandoned. Although commercial properties and fast-food chains replaced many Euclid Avenue homes during the second half of the 20th century, East Cleveland is still home to 18 of the original "Millionaire's Row" homes, while only six are left in the city of Cleveland.

East Cleveland is also home to the historic Lake View Cemetery (pedestrian gardens) final resting place of John D. Rockefeller, James A. Garfield, Eliot Ness, Alan Freed, Ray Chapman, Garrett Morgan, Adella Prentiss Hughes, Al Lerner, Carl Stokes at 12316 Euclid Ave. East Cleveland.

After World War II, development of other suburbs within the region brought a number of changes to East Cleveland. By the 1960s, African Americans constituted an increasingly large portion of the city's population. By 1984, East Cleveland was one of the largest primarily black communities in Ohio, with a population of 36,957.

Geography
East Cleveland is located at  (41.531701, -81.581948).

Most of the city is located in a relatively flat and relatively lower area contiguous with the city of Cleveland.  A small portion of the city lies atop a steep hill, and is contiguous with the neighboring city of Cleveland Heights; it also lies in a relatively flat area at a higher elevation.  Superior Road, Forest Hills Boulevard, Lee Road, Noble and North Taylor roads are the major through-streets ascending the hill. The McGregor Home and the Forest Hill Historic District are located on "the hill."

Surrounding communities
The University Circle neighborhood of Cleveland is immediately to the west of East Cleveland, on the other side of a railway viaduct that carries the RTA Red Line. Case Western Reserve University, University Hospitals Cleveland Medical Center, and the Cleveland Museum of Art are in University Circle.

Demographics

Households 
East Cleveland is a community with a housing density of 4,343 houses per square mile.  There are a total of 13,491 houses within the city limits.  Although the state average for renters in Ohio is 35%, the percentage of renters in East Cleveland specifically is 68%.  The 2015 median gross rent for East Cleveland was $472 per month. In East Cleveland, 95.8% spoke English, 2.1% Spanish and 1.2% Russian.

Income 
The 2011–2015 median household income for residents living in East Cleveland was $19,592. Along with that, 59% of household income is less than $25,000 annually.  Only 19% of households in East Cleveland have annual incomes between $25,000 and $44,000. The 2011–2015 median individual income for residents of East Cleveland was $14,442, with 52% of individual incomes being under $15,000 a year.  In addition, 31% of individual incomes in East Cleveland are between $15,000 and $34,000.

In 2018, East Cleveland was ranked as the 4th poorest city in America. Moreover, the city had a 41.8% poverty rate along with a $19,953 median household income.

2010 census
As of the census of 2010, there were 17,843 people, 8,286 households, and 4,043 families residing in the city. The racial makeup of the city was 93.2% African American, 4.6% white, 0.2% Native American, 0.2% Asian, 0.2% from other races, and 1.5% from two or more races. Hispanic or Latino of any race were 1.0% of the population.

There were 8,286 households, of which 24.9% had children under the age of 18 living with them, 16.5% were married couples living together, 26.4% had a female householder with no husband present, 5.9% had a male householder with no wife present, and 51.2% were non-families. 46.2% of all households were made up of individuals, and 15.4% had someone living alone who was 65 years of age or older. The average household size was 2.11 and the average family size was 3.03.

The median age in the city was 42.6 years. 22.2% of residents were under the age of 18; 9.8% were between the ages of 18 and 24; 20.6% were from 25 to 44; 28.6% were from 45 to 64; and 18.8% were 65 years of age or older. The gender makeup of the city was 45.1% male and 54.9% female.

2000 census
As of the 2000 Census, there were 27,217 people, 11,210 households, and 6,423 families residing in the city. The population density was 8,761.8 people per square mile (3,379.0/km2). There were 13,491 housing units at an average density of 4,343.1 per square mile (1,674.9/km2). The racial makeup of the city was 93.39% African American, 4.56% White, 0.22% Native American, 0.22% Asian, 0.01% Pacific Islander, 0.17% from other races, and 1.43% from two or more races. Hispanic or Latino of any race were 0.76% of the population.

There were 11,210 households, out of which 28.5% had children under the age of 18 living with them, 21.2% were married couples living together, 30.3% had a female householder with no husband present, and 42.7% were non-families. 38.0% of all households were made up of individuals, and 11.4% had someone living alone who was 65 years of age or older. The average household size was 2.39 and the average family size was 3.20.

In the city, the population was spread out, with 29.7% under the age of 18, 9.0% from 18 to 24, 26.6% from 25 to 44, 21.4% from 45 to 64, and 13.3% 65 years of age or older. The median age was 34 years. For every 100 females, there were 79.6 males. For every 100 females age 18 and over, there were 72.1 males.

The median income for a household in the city was $20,542, and the median income for a family was $26,053. Males had a median income of $26,123 versus $21,960 for females. The per capita income for the city was $12,602. About 28.0% of families and 32.0% of the population were below the poverty line, including 45.5% of those under age 18 and 22.5% of those age 65 or over.

Economy 
Per the 2012 Economic Census there are 1,105 locally owned businesses in East Cleveland.  Of these firms 944 are owned by minorities and 733 by women.  The portion of firms owned by minorities and women are significantly higher than both the state and national average.

Lately there has been a lot of interest in development by investors. This has led to the demolition of many old buildings, new constructions, the renovation of historic homes, the creation of green space for hundreds of abandoned properties close to Case Western Reserve University, University Hospital, John D. Rockefeller Park and the Historic Lake View Cemetery. 

A complete road repair of both Euclid Ave and Superior Ave has also led to interest and land purchases in the vicinity.

Parks and recreation 
The  Forest Hill Park boasts three baseball diamonds, tennis courts and walking trails that have retained the natural green space as intended by John D. Rockefeller, Jr. when he deeded the park to East Cleveland and the City of Cleveland Heights. Forest Hill Park is the largest single body of green park space between two large metroparks on the far east and west sides of Cleveland, Ohio.  The city also features Pattison Park and Hawley Park.

Government and politics 

East Cleveland is a charter city that is granted its authority under the home rule provisions of the Ohio constitution.

Prior to 1985, East Cleveland had been under the leadership of a Commission and City Manager. In 1985 voters grew frustrated with that form of government  after two commissioners were charged with theft in office, and after a revolving door of city managers resulted in little stability and a reduction in services. Citizens for Sound Government, a group of residents, led a petition drive to elect a strong mayor and to create a five-member city council. Attorney Darryl E. Pittman became the first mayor to lead the city since 1908. He was sworn in on January 1, 1986.

After two years on the job, in Pittman's second two-year term, Ohio's State Auditor declared on September 9, 1988 that East Cleveland was in fiscal emergency. The fiscal emergency designation came when the water and sewer fund were found to have deficits in excess of $2 million. Pittman was defeated in 1989 by Wallace D. Davis, the council president and a funeral home owner. Prior to his defeat, Pittman convinced former U.S. Rep. Louis Stokes to support a congressional amendment that made East Cleveland a "direct entitlement city" under HUD. That designation gave the city the authority to receive more than $1 million a year in block grant funding directly from HUD.

Davis borrowed $2.5 million that had to be paid back in eight years to get the city out of fiscal emergency. His administration made the last payment in 1997, but the city remained in fiscal emergency throughout Mayor Emmanuel Onunwor's eight-year term in office, and after he was indicted and convicted on federal charges of racketeering and corruption in 2004. Onunwor was sentenced to nine years in federal prison in September 2004. He was replaced by Council President Saratha Goggins who finished the remainder of his term.

Eric J. Brewer became the city's fourth elected mayor on January 1, 2006 and served one term. Brewer had been an investigative journalist. He negotiated an agreement with Cleveland Mayor Frank Jackson to take over East Cleveland's water department in 2008, resulting in significant savings to help the city as it struggled through fiscal emergency. The deal resulted in the transfer of city employees to Cleveland as part of the 25-year agreement.

During his primary re-election campaign in 2009, Brewer accused the police union of releasing photographs depicting him wearing women's lingerie.

Gary Norton, a Democrat first elected to the city council in 2006, was elected mayor after defeating Brewer by a nearly 2-1 margin in the Democratic primary election. He took office in January 2010. He did not face a challenger in the general election.

After two unsuccessful recall attempts, Gary Norton and city council president Thomas Wheeler were defeated in a special recall election on December 6, 2016. Norton lost 548 to 528 and Wheeler lost 229 to 211. The city council's vice president, Brandon King, assumed Norton's position as mayor. King won the September 2016 Democratic primary for mayor, and was elected on in November 2017 to serve out the remainder of Norton's term.

Crime 
The violent crime rate of 7.69 per 100,000 residents is about twice the national rate of 3.8 and above the statewide rate of 2.85. In the same way, the number of reported crimes per square mile (168) is about five times that of Ohio (35) and the nation (32.8).

Arrest of Arnold Black
On April 28, 2012, Detective Randy Hicks, Officer Jonathan O'Leary, and other members of the East Cleveland Police Department arrested Arnold Black on suspicion of drug activity. Hicks punched Black as O'Leary stood by. Black was then placed in a holding cell after his arrest and was later released. Black claimed that the police beat him while he was handcuffed and locked him in a storage closet for four days with no toilet and nothing to eat or drink but a carton of milk. In the resulting lawsuit, the police were unable to produce dashboard camera video of the beating or any police reports of the arrest. A jury initially awarded Black $22 million, including $10 million from Police Chief Ralph Spotts. The city appealed the verdict and the Eighth District Court of Appeals overturned the decision. The Ohio Supreme Court also refused to hear Black's appeal. However at a subsequent re-trial in 2019 Black was awarded US$20 million in compensatory damages and US$30 million in punitive damages.

Michael Madison

In 2013, a neighbor complained about a foul order, East Cleveland police attend a search warrant a discovered a decomposed body inside, Two more bodies of 2 African American women was later discovered, police found a total of 3 bodies of inside his house.

Education

The East Cleveland demographics on the levels of education are as follows: with 34% of residents having a high school diploma or equivalent, 37% have at least some college, and 7% have a completed bachelor's degree.

East Cleveland City Schools 
The East Cleveland City School District provides public education to more than 3000 students in seven new or renovated buildings that were updated as part of a $94 million state-sponsored school construction project.  Voters in 1997 agreed to add another $10 million to the $94 million for operating costs.

According to the Ohio Department of Education reports from January 2016, nearly 30% of high school students attending East Cleveland City Schools fail to graduate on time.  Students are falling behind state expectations in English, Language Arts, and Mathematics.  The district also lags behind the state in the performance index score.  During the 2014–2015 school year, East Cleveland City Schools’ performance index score was 66.8.  This was the lowest it had been in four years.

East Cleveland schools consist of Shaw High School, Heritage Middle School (formerly Kirk Middle School), Prospect Elementary School (closed in 2016) open for administrative use, Chambers Elementary School, Superior Elementary School, Mayfair Elementary School and Caledonia Elementary School.  Rozelle Elementary School was closed due to lower student enrollment and was later demolished.

East Cleveland Public Library operates the Main Branch at 14101 Euclid Avenue. In December 2009 the Caledonia Branch at 960 Caledonia Avenue, and the North Branch at 1425 Hayden Avenue were closed due to budget cuts and the decline in population. East Cleveland Public Library became a member of CLEVNET in 1985.

Infrastructure

East Cleveland is a major public transportation hub for northeast Ohio with a total of 80 (approximately one-third) of the Greater Cleveland Regional Transit Authority bus routes beginning or ending inside the city.

The GCRTA's Red Line's eastern terminus is located at the Windermere Rapid Station, located on Euclid Avenue in East Cleveland.  Destinations along the Red Line include University Circle, Cleveland State University, Tower City Center/Public Square, the West Side Market, and Hopkins International Airport. Passengers boarding GCRTA buses with stops in East Cleveland have access to an even wider range of employment, educational, recreational and cultural destinations throughout the Cleveland area.

Walkability 
In 2017, Walk Score rated the walkability of East Cleveland average with a score of 57.  This is comparable to the City of Cleveland's score of 60.

Medical care 
East Cleveland is home to several medical care facilities including the Candlewood Park Healthcare Center and the Stephanie Tubbs Jones Health Center. Candlewood Park Healthcare Center offers care for senior citizens including outpatient care and rehabilitation services.  The Stephanie Tubbs Jones Health Center, which is also a Cleveland Clinic facility, specializes in many different areas including cardiology, chronic disease services, diabetes, internal medicine, and general surgeries.

References

External links

 Official website of the City of East Cleveland (Alternate address)

 
Cities in Ohio
Cities in Cuyahoga County, Ohio
Populated places established in 1895
Urban decay in the United States
Scottish-American culture in Ohio
Cleveland metropolitan area
1895 establishments in Ohio